Stephanie Mooka (born 5 March 1991) is an Australian rugby league footballer who plays for the North Queensland Gold Stars in the QRL Women's Premiership.

Background
Born on Thursday Island, Mooka began playing rugby league for the Edmonton Lightning. After her local women's competition folded in 2011, Mooka took up rugby union and Australian rules football.

Playing career
In May 2019, Mooka represented Queensland Country at the Women's National Championships.

On 2 July 2019, Mooka signed with the St George Illawarra Dragons NRL Women's Premiership team. In Round 1 of the 2019 NRL Women's season, Mooka made her debut for the Dragons in a 4–14 loss to the Brisbane Broncos.

On 27 February 2020, Mooka was named in the inaugural North Queensland Gold Stars squad for the QRL Women's Premiership.

References

External links
NRL profile

1991 births
Living people
Indigenous Australian rugby league players
Australian female rugby league players
Rugby league centres
Rugby league wingers
St. George Illawarra Dragons (NRLW) players
Torres Strait Islanders